William McKendree Springer (May 30, 1836 – December 4, 1903) was a United States Representative from Illinois.

He was born near New Lebanon, Sullivan County, Indiana, May 30, 1836; moved to Jacksonville, Illinois, with his parents in 1848; attended the public schools in New Lebanon and Jacksonville and the Illinois College at Jacksonville where he was a member of Phi Alpha Literary Society; graduated from Indiana University in 1858; studied law; was admitted to the bar in 1859 and practiced in Lincoln, Illinois and Springfield, Illinois; was secretary of the State constitutional convention in 1862 at the young age of 26 and briefly served as assistant secretary of the state's senate; traveled in Europe 1868-1871; was member of the Illinois House of Representatives in 1871 and 1872; elected as a Democrat to the Forty-fourth and to the nine succeeding Congresses (March 4, 1875 – March 3, 1895).

During his service in Congress, he was involved in the investigation of election frauds during the Hayes-Tilden campaign.  He was chairman, Committee on Expenditures in the Department of State (Forty-fourth and Forty-fifth Congresses), Committee on Elections (Forty-sixth Congress), Committee on Expenditures in the Department of Justice (Forty-eighth Congress), Committee on Claims (Forty-ninth Congress), Committee on Territories (Fiftieth Congress), Committee on Ways and Means (Fifty-second Congress), Committee on Banking and Currency (Fifty-third Congress). While on the Committee on Territories Springer framed the bills that organized Oklahoma Territory and also created a federal judicial system for the Indian Territory. Springer created an Amendment as a "rider" to the Indian Appropriations Act for 1890. The Springer Amendment began the process of placing the Unassigned Lands of Indian Territory within the federal public domain and open to homesteaders. He was an unsuccessful candidate for reelection in 1894 to the Fifty-fourth Congress. He again resumed the practice of law in Washington, D.C., in 1895. He was appointed by President Grover Cleveland as a United States judge for the northern district of Indian Territory and chief justice of the United States Court of Appeals of Indian Territory.

In 1900 Springer left his judicial post to establish law offices in both Chicago and Washington, D.C. He also worked for the National Livestock Association as their lobbyist, where he became exposed to the Kiowa reserve grasslands.

Though the Springer Amendment helped to open up Indian lands to homesteaders, in 1901 William Springer was hired by two Kiowa Indians (later to include numerous other Indians from the KCA tribes) from the Kiowa, Comanche, Apache Reservation to represent them in what became the court case of Lone Wolf v. Hitchcock, 187 U.S. 553 (1903). Springer had aided in the writing of a memorial to the President protesting the 1900 Act that resulted from the Jerome Agreement between the Indians from the Kiowa, Comanche, and Apache Reservation and the members of the Jerome Commission. In the Jerome Agreement, the tribes of the KCA Reservation ceded most of their lands to the United States who would then open it up for allotment to white settlers. Lone Wolf asserted and Springer argued on his behalf in court that

 The Kiowa, Comanche, and Apache Indians were fraudulently induced to sign the Jerome Agreement and those that did sign did not fully understand its provisions vastly because, like Lone Wolf, most of the Indians did not speak English and relied on interpreters.
 The Jerome Agreement was not signed by three-fourths of the adult male members of the tribes as required by the Medicine Lodge Treaty.  Lone Wolf alleged that the total number of Indian males exceeded the number claimed by the Indian Agent and that the census of 1900 showed there were 639 adult male members of the KCA tribes on the reservation. Thus the Jerome Agreement was twenty-three signatures short of the required amount.
 The KCA had protested the agreement from the beginning.
 The version that was ratified by Congress had been significantly altered and amended and the changes made had not been submitted to the KCA for their approval. Springer argued for Lone Wolf that Congress should not be able to unilaterally alter the provisions of the agreement without the Indians' consent and thus the Act should be rejected.

On July 22, 1901, Springer, who was also aided by attorneys Hays McMeehan, William C. Reeves, and Charles Porter Johnson, filed for a temporary restraining order and a permanent injunction halting the cession and the opening of surplus lands after the members of the KCA tribes had been given their individual allotments.  The request for the restraining order was denied by Judge Clinton F. Irwin.  Springer and his colleagues appeal to The Supreme Court for the District of Columbia where on June 21, 1901, Justice A. C. Bradley denied the KCA's application for a temporary injunction. Springer appealed the District Court's decision to the Court of Appeals of the District of Columbia where the decision in the lower courts was upheld on December 4, 1901, by Chief Justice Alvey.

Finally, Springer, now aided by attorney Hampton Carson who was hired by the Indian Rights Association, appealed to the United States Supreme Court and where once again he was unsuccessful in his appeal.  On January 5, 1903, in a unanimous decision, the Court affirmed the Court of Appeals and upheld the Congressional action. The Court rejected the Indians' argument that Congress' action was a taking under the Due Process Clause of the Fifth Amendment. Justice Edward D. White described the Indians as the wards of the nation and matters involving Indian lands were the sole jurisdiction of Congress. Congress, therefore, had the power to abrogate the provisions of an Indian treaty, including the two million acre change. Justice John M. Harlan concurred in the judgment. This case maintained that the federal government had always had plenary power over tribes and could unilaterally abrogate Indian treaty rights despite the protests of the tribes.

Springer unsuccessfully challenged the federal income tax levied during the Civil War in the case of Springer v. United States.

William Springer died from pneumonia at his home in Washington D.C. on December 4, 1903. He was buried in Oak Ridge Cemetery, Springfield, Illinois.

References

External links

 

Democratic Party members of the Illinois House of Representatives
Illinois lawyers
Illinois College alumni
Indiana University alumni
Indian Territory judges
Politicians from Jacksonville, Illinois
Politicians from Springfield, Illinois
United States federal judges appointed by Grover Cleveland
19th-century American judges
1836 births
1903 deaths
Democratic Party members of the United States House of Representatives from Illinois
19th-century American politicians